Parkside is an inner southern suburb of Adelaide, South Australia. It is located in the City of Unley.

History
The suburb was once home to the mental health campus of the Royal Adelaide Hospital. Known as 'The Parkside Asylum', it was the primary mental health facility in the state, and occupied approximately one-third of the suburb's area.

Parkside Post Office opened on 10 December 1859 and was renamed Eastwood in 1967.

Geography
Parkside lies on the southern boundary of the southern park lands. It is bounded, among others, by Glen Osmond, Greenhill, Unley and Fullarton roads.

Demographics

The 2006 Census by the Australian Bureau of Statistics counted 4,634 persons in Parkside on census night. Of these, 46.9% were male and 53.1% were female.

The majority of residents (72.3%) are of Australian birth, with other common census responses being England (5.2%), Greece (2.9%) and Italy (2.8%).

The age distribution of Parkside residents is comparable to that of the greater Australian population. 71.7% of residents were over 25 years in 2006, compared to the Australian average of 66.5%; and 28.3% were younger than 25 years, compared to the Australian average of 33.5%.

Community

The local newspaper is the Eastern Courier Messenger. Other regional and national newspapers such as The Advertiser and The Australian are also available.

Schools
Parkside Primary School is located on Robsart Street. St Raphael's School is on Glen Osmond Road.

Facilities and attractions

Shopping and dining
The suburb is within walking distance of the Unley Road shopping and dining precinct.

Parks
One of the largest parks in Parkside is Howard Florey Reserve, on the corner of Campbell Road and Fullarton Road. Henry Codd Reserve lies between Maud Street and Fuller Street and connects via a walking trail to the Leicester Street playground. There is also Mcleay Park, lying between George Street and Jaffrey Street. Most of these parks are fenced in, making them suitable for small children. All have their own playgrounds.

Entertainment 
Slingsby Theatre Company, an internationally touring theatrical company, has its home on Glen Osmond Road. The company seeks to "...lovingly craft original, beautiful, complex, life-affirming, heartfelt, richly rewarding, emotive and bold theatre for adults and young people...".

Transportation

Roads
The suburb is serviced by several main roads. Unley and Fullarton Roads connect the suburb to the Adelaide city centre. Glen Osmond Road passes beside Parkside, linking the inner southeast of metropolitan Adelaide to the South Eastern Freeway.

Public transport
Public transport in Parkside is serviced by routes 171 and 172, run by the Adelaide Metro.

The Glenelg tram line is also very close to Parkside and there was once another tram line running south from the city.

See also
List of Adelaide suburbs

References

External links

Suburbs of Adelaide
Populated places established in 1849
1849 establishments in Australia